Pakistan Railways Academy or PRA, is the central training academy for employees of Pakistan Railways.

History
PRA was originally established as a training school for the employees of the North Western State Railway in Lyallpur (now Faisalabad) in January 1925. The school was shifted to Walton, Lahore on 8 March 1929 and named Walton Training School after Col. C.E. Walton, who was the general manager of the North-Western State Railway at the time. In 1954, the United Nations Regional Railway Training Centre was established by ECAFE (now ESCAP) at PRA. An Advanced Railway Course was introduced for the participants from the Railways of ESCAP, the Middle East and African Region. In 1958, the Regional Railway Training Center was taken over by the government and renamed the Pakistan Inter-Regional Railway Training College''' or PIRRTC. In 1983, the school was renamed Directorate of Research & Training'' by merging several institutions. In 2000, it was renamed to Pakistan Railways Academy. 112 courses have been completed at the school as of the year 2015. More than 1700 students are at the school from more than 40 countries.

Departments
The academy arranges training courses for newly recruited officers and members of the staff of Pakistan Railways belonging to various disciplines as well as promotion and refresher courses. The training is imparted through classrooms, model rooms, replicas of the actual systems in vogue on Pakistan Railways and also exposes the students to the actual working of the PR network.

In addition to the above following institutions are also located in the Academy:
Pakistan Railway Police Training School
Railway Accounts Training Center

See also
 Pakistan Railways

References

External links
 

Pakistan federal departments and agencies
Pakistan Railways
Auditoriums in Pakistan